Bdellovibrionales is an order of Pseudomonadota.

See also
 List of bacterial orders
 List of bacteria genera

References 

Bacteria orders